Seán Hayes (born 1960) is an Irish retired Gaelic footballer who played as a centre-forward for the Cork senior team.

Born in Cork, Cleary first played competitive Gaelic football during his schooling at Coláiste Chríost Rí. He arrived on the inter-county scene at the age of seventeen when he first linked up with the Cork minor team before later joining the under-21 side. He made his senior debut during the 1981 championship..

At club level Hayes is a three-time All-Ireland medallist with Nemo Rangers. In addition to this he has also won four Munster medals and several championship medals.

Throughout his career Hayes made 2 championship appearances. He retired from inter-county football following the conclusion of the 1981 championship.

In retirement from playing Hayes became involved in team management and coaching. After coaching Youghal at club level he later became manager of the Cork under-21 team.

Honours

Player

Nemo Rangers
All-Ireland Senior Club Football Championship (3): 1979, (sub), 1982, 1984, 1989
Munster Senior Club Football Championship (5): 1978, 1981, 1983, 1987 (sub), 1988
Cork Senior Club Football Championship (5): 1978, 1981, 1983, 1987, 1988

Cork
All-Ireland Under-21 Football Championship (2): 1980, 1981 (c)
Munster Under-21 Football Championship (2): 1980, 1981 (c)

Manager

Cork
Munster Under-21 Football Championship (1): 2014

References

1969 births
Living people
Nemo Rangers Gaelic footballers
Cork inter-county Gaelic footballers
Gaelic football managers
Gaelic football selectors
People educated at Coláiste Chríost Rí